The 2015–16 Slovenian PrvaLiga (also known as the Prva liga Telekom Slovenije for sponsorship reasons) was the 25th edition of the Slovenian PrvaLiga since its establishment in 1991. Also known by the abbreviation 1. SNL, PrvaLiga was contested by the top ten clubs in Slovenia, for the title of national champions. The season began on 17 July 2015 and ended on 21 May 2016.

Maribor was the defending champion, having won its 13th league title the previous season.

Competition format
Each team played 36 matches (18 home and 18 away). Teams played four matches against each other (2 home and 2 away).

Teams
A total of ten teams contested the league, including nine from the 2014–15 Slovenian PrvaLiga and one promoted from the 2014–15 Slovenian Second League.

Krško won direct promotion as champions of the Slovenian Second League. They replaced Radomlje in the top division, who finished at the bottom of the PrvaLiga table, ending their first season in the top division.

This was the first season for Krško in the Slovenian PrvaLiga.

Stadiums and locations

1Seating capacity only. Some stadiums (e.g. Krka, Krško, Rudar, Zavrč) also have standing areas.

Personnel and kits

League table

Standings

Positions by round

Results

First half of the season

Second half of the season

PrvaLiga play-off
The two-legged play-off between the ninth-placed team from the PrvaLiga and the second-placed team from the 2. SNL was played. The winner earned a place in the 2016–17 Slovenian PrvaLiga.

Zavrč won the play-off fixture against Aluminij 4–3 on aggregate, but the club was unsuccessful in obtaining a licence to play in the top division for the next season, due to financial reasons.

After their decision, the Football Association of Slovenia invited Aluminij to join the top division, with the side from Kidričevo accepting the offer.

Season statistics

Top goalscorers

Source:PrvaLiga official website

Top assists

Source:PrvaLiga official website

Hat-tricks

4 Player scored four goals

Discipline

Source:PrvaLiga official website

Attendances

 
 Note1: Krško played in the Slovenian Second League the previous season.

Awards

Annual awards
PrvaLiga Player of the Season
Rok Kronaveter

PrvaLiga Goalkeeper of the Season
Nejc Vidmar

PrvaLiga U23 Player of the Season
Miha Zajc

PrvaLiga Team of the Season

See also
2015 Slovenian Supercup
2015–16 Slovenian Football Cup
2016 Slovenian Football Cup Final
2015–16 Slovenian Second League

References
General

Specific

External links
 
2015–16 PrvaLiga at Soccerway.com

Slovenian PrvaLiga seasons
Sloven
1